These are the Billboard magazine Dance/Mix Show Airplay number-one hits of 2016.

Note that Billboard publishes charts with an issue date approximately 7–10 days in advance.

See also
2016 in music
List of Billboard Mainstream Top 40 number-one songs of 2016
List of Billboard Rhythmic number-one songs of the 2010s
List of number-one dance singles of 2016 (U.S.)
List of number-one Dance/Electronic Songs of 2016 (U.S.)

References

External links
BDS Dance Airplay Chart (updated weekly)

2016
United States Dance Airplay